The Second Wanzhou Yangtze River Bridge (万州长江二桥) is a suspension bridge over the Yangtze River in Wanzhou District of Chongqing, China.  Completed in 2004, it has a main span of  places it among the longest suspension spans in the world.

Accidents 

On 29 October 2018, a bus plunged off the Second Wanzhou Yangtze River Bridge into the Yangtze River, resulting in 13 deaths and 2 missing, without anybody confirmed alive.

See also
List of longest suspension bridge spans
Yangtze River bridges and tunnels

External links

References

Bridges in Chongqing
Bridges over the Yangtze River
Suspension bridges in China
Bridges completed in 2004